Virgin of Guadalupe College, Badajoz, Spain, was founded by the Society of Jesus in 1962. It accommodates pre-primary through baccalaureate and higher degree vocational training.

The school accommodates children of modest families from the neighborhoods San Roque, La Picuriña, and Suerte Saavedra, enrolling 1,200 students in 2012.

See also
 List of Jesuit sites

References

Jesuit secondary schools in Spain
Catholic schools in Spain
Secondary schools in Spain
Educational institutions established in 1962